The Famatina chinchilla rat (Abrocoma famatina) is a species of chinchilla rats in the family Abrocomidae found only in Argentina.

References

Abrocoma
Mammals of Argentina
Mammals described in 1920
Taxa named by Oldfield Thomas